Spokane, Portland & Seattle 700 is the oldest and only surviving example of the class "E-1" 4-8-4 "Northern" type steam locomotive and the only surviving original Spokane, Portland and Seattle steam locomotive. It was built by the Baldwin Locomotive Works in May 1938. Nearly identical to the class "A-3" Northerns built for Northern Pacific Railway, it burns oil instead of coal.

After years of running second-hand equipment, the Spokane, Portland and Seattle Railway (SP&S) was allowed by its parent companies, Great Northern Railway and Northern Pacific Railway, to purchase its first new locomotives. These included three Northern E-1 class locomotives (700, 701 and 702) for passenger service and six Z-6 class Challengers (4-6-6-4s) for freight service.

After retirement from service in 1956, the SP&S 700 was donated to the City of Portland, Oregon in 1958. It was on static public display at Oaks Amusement Park until 1987, then moved to private quarters for the continuation of work to restore it to operating condition. It began making occasional excursion runs in 1990. In 2012, the 700 was moved to a new facility where it can again be viewed by the public, the Oregon Rail Heritage Center.

History

Revenue service years

700 was delivered on June 21, 1938, joining the 702 pulling overnight passenger trains between Spokane and Vancouver, Washington, along the north shore of the Columbia River, with the 701 providing backup and pulling freight. Owing to an undersized turntable, the Northerns didn't reach Portland, Oregon until 1944.

By 1947, the Great Northern Railway had begun to streamline its premier passenger train, The Empire Builder, and had started adding diesels to the locomotive mix. SP&S also started purchasing diesels at this time, but they arrived after the streamlined cars were brought into service and for a few months, the 700s pulled the Portland section of Great Northern's Empire Builder and Northern Pacific's North Coast Limited.

In 1947, the 700 suffered a catastrophic derailment and fell on her side while pulling a passenger train in Washington. It is unknown if the engineer, fireman, or leading brakeman were injured or killed.

Through the late 1940s and early 1950s, the E-1s continued to pull secondary passenger trains, but by 1954, the diesels had completely replaced steam for passenger service and the E-1s were relegated to pulling freight trains until 1955.

Finally, on May 20, 1956, a spruced-up 700, with its normally grey smokebox painted silver, pulled its last passenger train. The Farewell To Steam run had a total of 21 cars carrying 1,400 passengers from Portland, Oregon to Wishram, Washington, in the heart of the Columbia Gorge, and back again.

After the trip, the 700, 701, 702, Challengers and other SP&S locomotives were sent to the scrap line. At the same time, however, Union Pacific Railroad was offering to donate a steam locomotive to the city of Portland, Oregon, and not to be outdone, the SP&S offered the 700. The two locomotives (SP&S 700 and OR&N 197) were moved into Oaks Park along the Willamette River in 1958 and were soon joined by SP 4449 where they sat for nearly 20 years. By 1960, No. 700 became one of only two SP&S steam locomotives left to survive, and the other locomotive is 2-8-2 No. 539, although 539 was originally built for the Northern Pacific Railway as their 1762.

Display at Oaks Park

For nearly 20 years the 700, along with the other two locomotives, sat behind chain link fences, slowly fading and rusting away. Only the attention of a single Southern Pacific Railroad employee, Jack Holst, saved the locomotives from complete uselessness. Mr. Holst regularly visited the locomotives and kept the bearings and rods well greased and oiled. Unfortunately, Mr. Holst died in 1972, before the first locomotive, SP 4449, was removed from Oaks Park and restored. In 1975, 15-year-old Chris McLarney started working on the 700, cleaning and oiling various parts. He founded the PRPA (Pacific Railroad Preservation Association) in 1977 to provide support for the preservation work.

Between 1987 and 1989, the SP&S 700 was moved from Oaks Park to the Southern Pacific's Brooklyn Roundhouse, in southeast Portland, for the continuation of restoration work. With the support of many individuals and the Burlington Northern Railroad, No. 700 returned to operation on May 15, 1990.

1990 to present

Although it's the third largest steam locomotive still in operation and expensive to run and insure, the 700 has managed a number of excursions since its restoration on May 15, 1990, including an historic doubleheader with SP 4449 from Portland, Oregon to Wishram, Washington and back during the 2005 National Railway Historical Society national convention and a 2002 "Steam across Montana" from Sandpoint, Idaho to Billings, Montana and back. In the Spring of 2001, the 700 ran a special excursion called the "Homecoming" excursion that ran over the original SP&S mainline through the Columbia River Gorge and lasted 4 days from Portland all the way to Spokane WA. The 700 lead the train solo almost the entire trip. At one point during the excursion, it started having mechanical issues and BNSF 6308, an EMD SD40-2 locomotive which would also end up being preserved, was taken off of the train it was on and helped the 700 the rest of the way. The excursion ended as a result of a derailment between the tool car and the power car. The lead trucks on the power car caused the derailment to occur ending the excursion abruptly. It also was disguised as Northern Pacific #2668 in 1992 for the Northern Pacific Rail Historical Society's convention, as the SP&S E-1 design is identical to the NP A-3 class, other than the SP&S' Northerns burned oil, while the NP's burned coal.

The 700 was added to the National Register of Historic Places on January 25, 2006, as the Spokane, Portland and Seattle Railway Steam Locomotive.

Disposition and maintenance

Until June 2012, the 700 and its two companions resided at the Brooklyn Roundhouse. The City of Portland was leasing the roundhouse from its owner, Union Pacific Railroad (UP), but after the railroad announced plans to demolish the roundhouse to allow expansion of the yard, the engines needed to find a new home. The Oregon Rail Heritage Foundation, with significant support from the City of Portland, raised funds for a new restoration and visitor center adjacent to the Oregon Museum of Science and Industry to provide the city's steam locomotives with a permanent and publicly accessible home before the closure of the roundhouse.

Construction of the new Oregon Rail Heritage Center began in October 2011 and the 700 and the other two locomotives were moved to the site of the new enginehouse and heritage center on June 26, 2012.  They were moved indoors on July 28, once the enginehouse was enclosed.  The ORHC opened to the public on September 22, 2012.  Maintenance of the 700 continues to be carried out by the Pacific Railroad Preservation Association and a team of volunteers. The locomotive was taken out of service in 2015 for its 1,472-day inspection as mandated by the Federal Railroad Administration (FRA). Since then, dedicated volunteers have been working steadily to inspect, repair and reassemble the locomotive. In August 2020, Emery Trust awarded a grant of $35,000 to help complete No. 700's rebuild, and it is hoped that the locomotive will be ready to return to operation in 2023.

See also

 Southern Pacific 4449
 Oregon Railroad & Navigation 197
 Oregon Rail Heritage Foundation

Notes

References

External links 

 All aboard the SP&S 700
 The Pacific Railroad Preservation Association
 SP&S 700
 Pacific Northwest Chapter of the National Railway Historical Society
 Oregon Railway Heritage Foundation
 N Scale Kitbash/Scratchbuild of SP&S #700

700
4-8-4 locomotives
Baldwin locomotives
Individual locomotives of the United States
Transportation in Portland, Oregon
Rail transportation in Oregon
Railway locomotives on the National Register of Historic Places
National Register of Historic Places in Portland, Oregon
Hosford-Abernethy, Portland, Oregon
Standard gauge locomotives of the United States
Rail transportation on the National Register of Historic Places in Oregon
Railway locomotives introduced in 1938
Preserved steam locomotives of Oregon